Porphyrochroa argentata is a species of dance flies, in the fly family Empididae.

It was recorded for the first time in The Dominican Republic.

References

Empididae
Insects described in 2002
Diptera of South America
Insects of the Dominican Republic